John Elden McLeay (30 March 1922 – 26 December 2000) was an Australian politician. He was a member of the Liberal Party and represented the Division of Boothby in South Australia from 1966 to 1981. He held ministerial office in the Fraser Government as Minister for Construction (1975–1978) and Administrative Services (1978–1980).

Early life 
McLeay was born in Adelaide, the son of Sir John McLeay, a federal politician, as was his brother, George McLeay.  McLeay was educated at Scotch College and volunteered for the second Australian Imperial Force in 1941 and served in New Guinea as a gunner from 1942 to 1943.  He was a member of the Unley City Council from 1949 to 1970 and was mayor from 1961 to 1963.

Political career

After his father's retirement as the member for Boothby, McLeay was elected in his place at the 1966 election, representing the Liberal Party. He was supportive of the white minority governments in South Africa and Rhodesia. While visiting the latter in February 1970, he was interviewed on a Rhodesian Broadcasting Corporation television program, during which he controversially described Australia as "almost a Communist state" and praised Rhodesia as "much more advanced in some ways than we are". Prime Minister John Gorton subsequently stated that the government had no intentions of relaxing sanctions on Rhodesia. The interview increased McLeay's profile in Australia and his name became "a by-word for right-wing opinions" according to The Canberra Times.

McLeay was Assistant Minister assisting the Minister for Civil Aviation from August 1971 until the defeat of the McMahon Government at the December 1972 election.  He was appointed Minister for Construction in the Fraser ministry from December 1975 until December 1978, when he was appointed Minister for Administrative Services.  He was not reappointed to the ministry in November 1980 and resigned from parliament in January 1981.

Later life
McLeay was Australia's Consul General to Los Angeles from 1981 to 1983.  He was survived by his wife, Clythe and their three sons.

Notes

1922 births
2000 deaths
Liberal Party of Australia members of the Parliament of Australia
Members of the Australian House of Representatives for Boothby
Members of the Australian House of Representatives
Consuls-General of Australia in Los Angeles
Politicians from Adelaide
John Jr.
People educated at Scotch College, Adelaide
20th-century Australian politicians
Australian Army personnel of World War II
Australian Army soldiers